Divyashwori Shah is a Nepali politician belonging to Nepali Congress. She is from dhangadhi -2 ratopool,kailali,sudurpaschim pardesh.She is also serving as member of the Sudurpashchim Province Provincial Assembly. Shah vied for the post of vice president of Nepali Congress in 14th general convention of Nepali Congress from Bimalendra Nidhi pannel.

References 

Living people
Year of birth missing (living people)
Nepali Congress politicians from Sudurpashchim Province
Members of the Provincial Assembly of Sudurpashchim Province